Rollright is a civil parish in West Oxfordshire, England. It contains the villages of Great Rollright and Little Rollright and some of the prehistoric Rollright Stones. The parish is on West Oxfordshire's boundary with Cherwell District and Oxfordshire's boundary with Warwickshire.  Andrew Breeze has proposed that the name Rollright is from the Brittonic phrase *rodland rïx 'wheel enclosure groove', where *rïx 'groove' refers to the gorge near Great Rollright and *rodland 'wheel enclosure' refers to the King's Men circle of the Rollright Stones.

References

West Oxfordshire District
Civil parishes in Oxfordshire